Renjilal Damodaran is an Indian filmmaker, scriptwriter, and producer. He has made films with contemporary social issues. He made his directorial debut in 2007 with his first Malayalam feature film  Ennittum. His second film was bilingual Naval Enna Jewel (2017) in Malayalam and Nawal the Jewel in English (drama). For the film, N.G. Roshan was awarded Kerala State Award 2016 for the best makeup artist. The film received three Kerala State Film Critics Awards in 2017 for Best Makeup (N.G. Roshan), Best Sound Design (Ranganath Ravee) and Best Costume Design (S.B. Satheesh).

Early life 

He completed his masters in Malayalam literature from S.N.College, Kollam with first class in 1992. In 1993 he completed journalism from public relations of Kerala, Thiruvananthapuram. He wrote a column about Cinema in ‘Janayugam’ weekly. In 1995, he completed Mphil from the University of Madras, Department of Malayalam and his thesis was the first thesis subject about cinema in India.

In 1995 he started his film career as an assistant director, under Bhadran the leading director of the time. In 1996, he joined C.T.M.A College, Guindy, Chennai as a lecturer in the Malayalam language. Soon, he resigned his job and started his work as an associate director. He worked with Thampi Kannanthanam in 1996, then with director and cameraman Venu for the film Daya scripted by M.T.Vasudevan Nair, and starring Manju  Varrier in both male and female roles. It received four national awards.

In 1998, he worked with Bhadran for the film Olympian Antony Adam starring Mohanlal and Meena. Then he took a break from the film industry to establish his business firm Damu and Sons Sales Corporation, Kottarakkara, Kerala.

In 2006 he made his debut as a director with his feature film Ennittum starring Kaniha, Siddharth Bharathan, Swarnamalya, and Dinu Dennis. He was inactive in the film industry for some time until his second film Naval Enna Jewel which was bilingual starring Adhil Hussain, Shwetha Menon, Reem Khadem and Anu Sithara.

Filmography

References

Sources
Milan IFF 2018 Nominations Archives
Amsterdam IFF 2018 Full Winners List
Awards International Film Festival of Shimla 2018
London IFF 2019 Winners
From war zone to silver screen
Shweta Menon's Naval Enna Jewel nominated for Amsterdam Film Festival - Times of India
Naval Enna Jewel: Can you identify this actress dressed up like an old man? [PHOTOS+VIDEOS]

Living people
Film producers from Kerala
Indian filmmakers
Screenwriters from Kerala
Year of birth missing (living people)